Javor is a municipality and village in Klatovy District in the Plzeň Region of the Czech Republic. It has about 70 inhabitants.

Administrative parts
The village of Loučany is an administrative part of Javor.

Gallery

References

Villages in Klatovy District